Matthew Bruce may refer to:

 Matthew Linn Bruce (1860–1936), American lawyer and politician
 Matthew Bruce (weightlifter), or Matt Bruce (born 1983), American weightlifter